Borja Cobeaga Eguillor (born 1977) is a Spanish film director and screenwriter. He was nominated for an Academy Award for Best Live Action Short Film for his 2005 film, One Too Many.

Filmography

Feature films

Short films

Television

References

External links

Spanish film directors
Living people
1977 births
People from San Sebastián
Basque writers
Film directors from the Basque Country (autonomous community)
University of the Basque Country alumni
21st-century Spanish screenwriters